Kilachand Hall, formerly known as Shelton Hall and before that the Hotel Sheraton, is one of eight dormitories at Boston University. Living quarters are divided into four- and five-person suites, with a few private doubles. It is one of the few dormitories on campus with private bathrooms. The ninth floor consists of a study lounge that provides an impressive view of Cambridge, the Charles River, and Fenway Park.

History

Hotel Sheraton 

The building was constructed in 1923 as one of the first Sheraton hotels by the Bay State Road Company.  Above the entrance the name "Sheraton" can still be seen engraved in the concrete. Unlike the hotels of today, the Sheraton was a type of residential hotel, where it was common for guests to stay for months without signing a lease. The top floor, given its unique views, was used as a ballroom and social space, playing host to jazz bands.

In 1939, Ernest Henderson bought the hotel. At the time, the building had an electric sign on the roof reading "Hotel Sheraton" which would have been expensive to remove so he renamed his other properties to be Sheraton hotels, starting the chain known today.

Shelton Hall 
In 1950, the building was bought and renamed to the Hotel Shelton. In 1954, Boston University bought the hotel and converted it to a girls-only dormitory of the same name.

In 1953, playwright Eugene O'Neill died in suite 401 on the fourth floor. In his honor, the fourth floor was named a specialty housing area called the Writer's Corridor. School folklore holds that the building is haunted by the playwright. Lights on this floor are dimmer and the elevators randomly stop at the fourth floor. Howard Stern also claims to have lived there.

Kilachand Hall 
In 2010, the building was renamed Kilachand Hall, in accordance with the creation of the Kilachand Honors College. Freshman students in the honors college are required to live on the second, third, fourth, or fifth floor.

In 2012, the dining hall on the first floor was removed with the opening of a new, larger dining hall, Marciano Commons, across the street. This coincided with a larger renovation of the building that added a study lounge, classroom, and administrative offices for the honors college on the first floor.

References

External links
Kilachand Hall on Boston University

Buildings at Boston University
Boston University Housing System